Kramgoa låtar 7 is a 1979 Vikingarna studio album and the band's first album following Christer Sjögren replacing Stefan Borsch as the band's singer. The album was rereleased to CD in  1996.

Track listing

Side 1
Djinghis Khan (Dschinghis Khan) - 3.03
Hjärtats röst (Jealous Heart) - 2.23
Annie's Song (instrumental) - 3.14
Om du lämnar mig så här - 3.14
Så länge du älskar är du ung (500 Miles Away from Home) - 3.22
Jag kommer hem (I'm Coming Home) - 2.27
Jag var så kär - 2.55
Such a Night - 2.57

Side 2
Hallelujah - 3.11
Veronica - 3.24
Playa Ingles - 3.20
Twilight Time - 3.16
Hooray Hooray (Hooray Hooray It's a Holi-Holiday) - 3.00
Tro på mej (Can't Help Falling in Love) - 2.42
Ge mig en sång - 3.16

Charts

References 

1979 albums
Vikingarna (band) albums
Swedish-language albums